Samuel Grenville Roberts (also known as Samuel Granville Roberts, 16 August 1919 – 3 June 1940) was an English professional footballer who played as a inside forward in the Football League for Nottingham Forest.

Personal life
Roberts served in the British Army as a private in the 2nd/5th Battalion of the West Yorkshire Regiment, part of the 46th Infantry Division, during the Second World War. He died of wounds following a strafing attack by German Stukas at Dunkirk on 3 June 1940. Roberts is commemorated at the Dunkirk Memorial.

Career statistics

References

1919 births
1940 deaths
Military personnel from Derbyshire
Footballers from Derbyshire
English footballers
Association football inside forwards
Nottingham Forest F.C. players
West Yorkshire Regiment soldiers
British Army personnel killed in World War II
English Football League players
Deaths by airstrike during World War II